James Ross Lovelace (February 6, 1940 – October 29, 2004) was an American jazz drummer.

Biography
He was born in Kansas City, Missouri.  By the early 1960s, he had begun performing in jazz clubs in New York City.  From the mid-1960s to the 1980s, he was a session musician on albums by performers such as Junior Mance, Tony Scott, George Benson, and Wes Montgomery, with whom he also played regularly.  In 1967 he played on the debut album by singer-songwriter Leonard Cohen. 

In later years, he regularly played at Smalls Jazz Club in West Village, with pianist Frank Hewitt, and as a member of the band Across 7th Street, that also featured Sacha Perry (piano), Chris Byars (saxophone), and Ari Roland (bass).  They released an album, The Eternal Pyramid, in 2004.

He died from pancreatic cancer in Manhattan in 2004, at the age of 64.

References

External links
 

1940 births
2004 deaths
American jazz drummers